Castro Valley station is a Bay Area Rapid Transit (BART) station located in the center median of Interstate 580 in Castro Valley, California. The entrance plaza, parking lots, and bus transfer area are located on the north side of the highway; a tunnel under the westbound lanes connects the entrance to the fare lobby, which is located under the island platform. The station opened on May 10, 1997, as part of the extension to Dublin/Pleasanton station.

References

External links 

BART - Castro Valley

Bay Area Rapid Transit stations in Alameda County, California
Stations on the Blue Line (BART)
Railway stations in the United States opened in 1997